Mickey Ibarra served as director of The White House Office of Intergovernmental Affairs in the Clinton administration. He was born in Salt Lake City, Utah, the son of a Mexican immigrant father and an American mother.

Background
Mickey Ibarra was born in Salt Lake City, Utah, on March 27, 1951.

His father, Francisco Nicolas Santiago Ibarra, first came to the United States as a bracero from Oaxaca, Mexico in 1945.  He picked fruits at Spanish Fork, Utah.  Later, he worked at the Kennecott Copper Mine as a demolition crew member—a union job with better benefits and job security.

The marriage between his Mexican father and younger, white Mormon mother, Bonnie Bird, ended in divorce when he was two years old.  His mother, who was 18 at the time, and his father relinquished custody of Mickey and his younger brother David to the Children's Service Society of Utah.  Together, they were placed in foster care for most of the first fifteen years of his life.

Mickey Ibarra served in the United States Army from 1970 to 1973. He received his undergraduate degree in political science from Brigham Young University, with the assistance of the G.I. Bill for his military service. He also earned a master's degree in education from the University of Utah and was awarded an honorary doctorate of humane letters in 2007.

Career
Mickey Ibarra is the president of the Ibarra Strategy Group, a government relations and public affairs firm based in Washington, D.C.—celebrating 19 years of service.

He began teaching in Utah County in 1977 at a public alternative high school for at-risk students, and then moved his teaching responsibilities to Salt Lake County. He attended the University of Utah while he continued teaching – a part-time arrangement he notes that discourages many teachers from continuing their education throughout their careers.

Ibarra taught at-risk high school students for five years in the Utah public schools. As a teacher, Ibarra became involved in the Utah Education Association and later with the National Education Association (NEA). From the NEA's state office in New Mexico, he moved to the headquarters in Washington, D.C., in 1984. By 1990, he was the political manager at the NEA.  His responsibilities there included assisting with campaign strategy development, federal candidate support, political education, and state government affairs. He also served as the senior adviser and director of special projects for the Clinton-Gore '96 campaign.

At the White House, Mr. Ibarra was responsible for building support for the President's policy initiatives and responding to the concerns of state and local elected officials as well as the U.S. Territories and Indian nations. In 1998, President Clinton appointed Ibarra to serve as a vice-chair of the White House Task Force for the 2002, Salt Lake Winter Olympic Games.  He was named an honorary mayor for the Para-Olympic Games. Additionally, he co-chaired the White House Task Force on Drug Use in Sports.

Community work
Mickey Ibarra is the founder and chairman of the Latino Leaders Network, a non-profit organization dedicated to ‘Bringing Leaders Together” to establish relationships, build unity, and share leader stories.  Since 2004, the Latino Leaders Network has convened 92 signature events—the Tribute to Mayors and the Latino Leaders Luncheon Series across the country.  He is the editor of Latino Leaders Speak: Personal Stories of Struggle and Triumph, published by Arte Publico Press at the University of Houston.

Among his many avocations, he served six years on the board of directors of MALDEF, heads the Latino Leaders Network (a non-profit organization dedicated to bringing leaders together), and assists the Ibarra Foundation.

In 2013, Ibarra was named one of the "Top Latino lobbyists in D.C." by Latino Magazine.

In 2008, Hispanic Magazine named him among the "25 Most Powerful Hispanics in Washington, D.C."

Awards

On behalf of the Mexican government and the Consul of Mexico, Ibarra was presented the Ohtli Award on May 4, 2018.  The Ohtli is one of Mexico's highest honors that recognizes outstanding individuals of Latino origin who have empowered the well-being and prosperity of Mexican communities abroad.  Mickey Ibarra stated, “I accept this high honor, the Ohtli Award, for my father Francisco Ibarra, a Zapotec from Oaxaca, who came to Utah in 1945 as a bracero to pick fruit in Spanish Fork. It is his courage, pride, hard work, love of Mexico and the United States that inspired my brother, David and me to always dream big.”

Ibarra was presented the Maestro of Leadership Award by Latino Leaders Magazine in 2017, the Latino Spirit Award for Achievement in Public Service by the California Latino Legislative Caucus in 2016 and the U.S. Hispanic Chamber of Commerce Community Champion Award in 2014. Additionally, he received the inaugural 2012 Mickey Ibarra Medallion for Excellence in Government Relations from the U.S. Hispanic Leadership Institute. Mr. Ibarra is a graduate of the University of Utah earning a master's degree and was awarded an Honorary Doctorate of Humane Letters in 2007.  Ibarra received the Distinguished Alumnus Award from the University of Utah in 2001.

He was also awarded the 2009 Community Public Service Award by the National Capital_Area_Council of the Boy Scouts of America. In 2006, he was named a Hinckley Institute of Politics Fellow at the University of Utah and received the Award of Excellence in Education from the Utah Hispanic Chamber of Commerce.

Books
Latino Leaders Speak Personal Stories of Struggle and Triumph [published 2017] is a compilation of stories by successful Latino leaders in a variety of occupations from politics and sports to education and activism.  Their writings are both a testament to perseverance and a guide to life, for readers of all backgrounds. These stories of obstacles overcome to achieve success include former Los Angeles Mayor Antonio Villaraigosa; former general manager of the New York Mets, Omar Minaya; and Dr. Francisco G. Cigarroa, the Chancellor of the University of Texas System.

In MICKEYISMS: 30 Tips for Success, Ibarra offers leadership lessons acquired during his 30-year career.

External links
 “How To Stop Illegal Immigration Without Building A Wall, According To A Clinton Adviser” https://aplus.com/a/mickey-ibarra-family-separation-white-house?no_monetization=true Retrieved Oct. 18, 2018
 “Mickey Ibarra” https://artepublicopress.com/blog/mickey-ibarra/ Retrieved Oct 15, 2018
 “Latino leaders meet in Houston to dispel negative Hispanic stereotypes” https://www.chron.com/news/houston-texas/houston/article/Latino-leaders-meet-in-Houston-to-dispel-negative-13248905.php Retrieved Oct. 10, 2018
 “From foster care to the White House, Mickey Ibarra urges Latinos to ‘dream big’” https://www.deseretnews.com/article/865685639/From-foster-care-to-the-White-House-Mickey-Ibarra-urges-Latinos-to-dream-big.html Retrieved Oct. 18, 2018
 “Mickey Ibarra Alumnus, M.Ed. Special Education” https://education.utah.edu/alumni/profiles/mickey-ibarra.php Retrieved Oct. 17, 2018
 “Mickey Ibarra: Latino Leaders Speak: Personal Stories of Struggle and Triumph” https://www.changinghands.com/event/june2018/mickey-ibarra-latino-leaders-speak-personal-stories-struggle-and-triumph Retrieved Oct. 18, 2018
 “Living With A White Mormon Family As A Foster Kid Was ‘A Real Identity Struggle’ Yet Something That Shaped His Career” https://wearemitu.com/politics/from-foster-kid-to-working-in-the-white-house-how-mickey-ibarra-became-a-success-story/ 
“LATINO LEADERS SPEAK Reading and Signing” https://artepublicopress.com/event/latino-leaders-speak/ Retrieved Oct. 9 2018

References

1951 births
Brigham Young University alumni
Clinton administration personnel
Living people
University of Utah alumni